Ectoedemia ruwenzoriensis is a moth of the family Nepticulidae. It is only known from the Rwenzori Mountains in Uganda.

It is possible that the larvae feed on Hypericum, because tree-forming Hypericum species occur commonly in the higher montane zones, such as the ericaceous belt or Hagenia-Hypericum zone.

References

Nepticulidae
Moths of Africa
Endemic fauna of Uganda
Moths described in 1965